The 1952–53 international cricket season was from September 1952 to April 1953.

Season overview

October

Pakistan in India

December

South Africa in Australia

January

India in the West Indies

February

Ceylon in India

March

South Africa in New Zealand

References

International cricket competitions by season
1952 in cricket
1953 in cricket